Morehead Hill Historic District is a national historic district located at Durham, Durham County, North Carolina. The district encompasses 206 contributing buildings in a predominantly residential section of Durham. They were built between the late-19th century and 1950s and include notable examples of Late Victorian, Queen Anne, and Bungalow / American Craftsman style architecture.

It was listed on the National Register of Historic Places in 1985, with a boundary increase in 2004.

Notable buildings 
 John Sprunt Hill House
 Greystone Manor

References

Historic districts on the National Register of Historic Places in North Carolina
Queen Anne architecture in North Carolina
Victorian architecture in North Carolina
Historic districts in Durham, North Carolina
National Register of Historic Places in Durham County, North Carolina
Neighborhoods in Durham, North Carolina